Riverfront Stadium is a light rail station in the Washington Park section of Newark, Essex County, New Jersey, United States. The station is a single low-level platform for trains used by the Newark Light Rail branch to Newark Broad Street station. Riverfront Stadium station is a northbound-only stop, located across Broad Street from the terminus. 

The station opened on July 17, 2006 when an extension from Newark Penn Station opened to Broad Street station. Riverfront Stadium station attained its name from the Bears & Eagles Riverfront Stadium, an independent baseball league ballpark. The station was located next to the entrance to Gate C, however, the stadium closed in 2013 and the city razed the stadium in 2019.

References

External links

Newark Light Rail stations
Railway stations in the United States opened in 2006
2006 establishments in New Jersey